I is a 2016 Iranian film written and directed by Soheil Beiraghi. The film screened for the first time at the 34th Fajr Film Festival.

Plot 
This film is the story of a woman named Azar who commits illegal acts against others and earns money in this way.

The film's director said that "my first goal was to present a picture of an unusual woman and that I was going to portray her solo revolution against the law, the people and the norms of the surrounding society, and thus, the script was straightforward."

Cast 

 Leila Hatami as Azar
 Amir Jadidi as Arya
 Behnoush Bakhtiari as Malihe
 Mani Haghighi as Azar's reporter

Screening

National 
I film first screening was at the 34th Fajr Film Festival (February 2015).

I started its screening out-of-festival on August 17, 2016, with a very low number of 14 cinemas and was extremely well received; So that after 10 days and only in 17 cinemas in Tehran and 10 cinemas in other cities, sales exceeded 600 million Tomans. The film became profitable in the second week of release and finally ended its national release on November 5 of the same year, with a total of three billion Tomans of domestic and foreign box office.

International 
I film has participated in or been screened at festivals on four continents and in several countries.

The film is also available at Amazon website.

 Fajr Film Festival (Film's Domestic Festival)  (1–11 February 2016/ Iran) The Best Supporting Actor "Amir Jadidi", The Best Supporting Actress "Behnoush Bakhtiari"
 20th POFF, Tallinn Black Nights Film Festival, 11th - 27th Nov. 2016, Tallinn - Estonia (Forum Section)
 6th Iranian Film Festival, 10th - 21st Jan. 2017, Prague - Czech (competition section)
 7th London Iranian Film Festival, 28th Oct. - 7th Nov. 2016, London - UK
 Museum of Fine Arts Houston, 20–22 January 2017, Houston, US
 Museum of Fine Arts Boston, 26 and 28 January 2017, Boston, US
 6th Iranian Film Festival Australia, 20th Oct. - 13th Nov. 2016, Australia
 Iranian Film Festival Zurich, May 2017, Zurich, Swiss
 Smithsonian Institution, 11th Feb. 2017, Washington, US
 Gene Siskel Film Center, 4th and 5th Feb. 2017, Chicago, US
 Persian Cine Club, May 2017, Geneva, Swiss
 China National Film Museum, 23 – 29 August 2017, Beijing, China
 15th Pune Int’l Film Festival, 12–19 January 2017, Pune - India
 Guwahati Int'l Film Festival, October 28–2 November 2017, India

Awards

Commentary and controversy

IRIB 
Islamic Republic of Iran Broadcasting (IRIB) abstained from releasing the teaser trailers of I (Me) on the pretext that they had been shown on Gem TV, a Persian-language entertainment satellite channel.  The film crew tried to convince them that they were unaware of the teaser's release on the satellite channel, but the IRIB's television commercial authorities simply asked for a property deed and did nothing more. The municipality made matters worse by not allowing the placement of any billboards or posters in public places which made the outdoor advertising of the movie practically impossible. On the other hand, the film's screening at the 34th Fajr International Film Festival in Mashhad was cancelled. If it weren't for the advertisements posted on the social networking platforms, I (Me) wouldn't be a box office success. The film was also ranked among the best works of the year by some film periodicals such as Film and 24.

Urban advertising and the press 
Saeed Khani (producer) told ISNA that the film did not use TV, environmental and urban advertisements in any way and only managed to sell 600 million Tomans in ten days by using a team of 15 people to produce content in Social media.

Cancelling of the screening in Mashhad 
I screening was canceled as part of the 34th Fajr Festival in Mashhad.

Using age ratings for promoting 
Some critics have said that the phrase "watching this movie is not recommended for people under the age of 15" in the movie posters and teasers were used to advertise and attract teenage audiences to watch the movie, while the movie does not have such content. However, the agents stated that the age classification is determined by the show licensing council and its inclusion in the poster is the decision of this council.

Selling 
Soheil Beirghi announced in the film's press conference that "if sales reach one billion and 10 million tomans, it will enter the profit stage." Therefore, this film, with a profit of 1 billion and 181 million tomans, has been able to more than double its production cost. To sell.

The film's film monthly also called "Me" a "popular movie in theatres" which has garnered a lot of positive reviews from critics.

References

External links 
 

Films directed by Soheil Beiraghi